The Baía de São Marcos is a bay of the Atlantic Ocean in Maranhão state of northeastern Brazil.

It receives several rivers, including the Grajaú, Mearim, and Pindaré. The Mearim is known for its pororoca, or tidal bore.

São Luís Island, also known as Maranhão Island, separates the Baía de São Marcos from the Baía de São Jose just to the east. São Luís Island is home to São Luís, Maranhão's capital.

Estuaries of Brazil
Landforms of Maranhão
Bays of Brazil